An Iraqi map pendant, usually worn on women's necklaces, has achieved some popularity as a symbol of Iraqi unity in the face of the widespread ethnic and sectarian violence in the country.

Origin
Necklaces with map pendants were sold before the 2003 invasion, but they were not especially common.  They have gained currency thereafter, and especially as a statement against the subsequent development of communal violence and increased social balkanization.  

The necklaces have been prominently worn by a number of Iraqi women television journalists. Many women have adopted the necklace in tribute to the life of journalist Atwar Bahjat, who was murdered in 2006.

Practices
The pendant necklaces are commonly sold in silver and gold, for the equivalent of about US$15 and $100 respectively.

Iraqi men have also worn map pendants as lapel pins, and some have pinned them to military uniforms.

Sources
Rageh, Rawya (Sep. 2, 2006). "For Iraqi women, map-shaped necklaces become a symbol of defiance, yearning for unity". Associated Press.
Tarabay, Jamie (April 8, 2007). "Maps of Iraq Symbolize Unity Call". All Things Considered (radio broadcast). National Public Radio.

Map pendant
Map pendant
Necklaces
National symbols of Iraq